Daniel Riordan (born 25 September 1984) is a rugby union player for Old Belvedere in the All-Ireland League. He began playing rugby at Coláiste Iognáid, where he won a schools' senior cup in 2002 and was on the Connacht Schools team in 2000 and 2001.

Career
Upon leaving Coláiste Iognáid in Galway, Riordan continued to play for Galway Corinthians RFC and entered the Connacht Rugby Academy.

Upon receiving a full contract with Connacht, Riordan then played his club rugby for Buccaneers RFC in Athlone. He recently played club rugby for is also contracted to UL Bohemians R.F.C. in Limerick, who play in AIB League Division 2. But for season 2010–11 Riordan moved to Dublin and now plays for Old Belvedere RFC, and has been called into the Leinster Rugby squad for their Magners League fixture against Scarlets on 04/03/2011.

Daniel Riordan's position of choice is as a Full-back and he can also operate as a Centre or on the Wing.

A former U-21 International, Riordan was called into the Ireland A side that was defeated by England Saxons on 1 February 2008.

References

External links
Connacht profile
Munster Rugby Profile
Munster Rugby Match Report (v Ulster 25-09-2009)
Old Belvedere Profile

1984 births
Living people

Connacht Rugby players
Ireland international rugby sevens players
Irish rugby union players
Old Belvedere R.F.C. players
Rugby union players from County Galway
Rugby union wings